The South Haven South Pierhead Light is a lighthouse in Michigan, at the entrance to the Black River on Lake Michigan. The station was lit in 1872, and is still operational.  The tower is a shortened version of the Muskegon South Pierhead Light, and replaced an 1872 wooden tower. The catwalk is original and still links the tower to shore: it is one of only four that survive in the State of Michigan.

History

The keeper's house is on shore, 2- stories tall, wood with a hipped-roof.  It was also built in 1872, and is located at 91 Michigan Avenue onshore, was transferred to the city for preservation in 2000. The Michigan Maritime Museum has renovated the keeper's house as the Marialyce Canonie Great Lakes Research Library.

A Fifth order Fresnel lens manufactured by Parisian glass makers Barbier and Fenestre was installed in the lantern.

The current tower was designed by Eleventh District engineer James G. Warren.

The U.S. Lighthouse Service elected to tear down the wooden lighthouse and replace it.  On October 6, 1903 ten workers arrived on the USLHS tender Hyacinth and began the project.  It took a little more than a month to complete the project.  According to The Daily Tribune (October 14, 1903) the lantern room was brought from Muskegon, Michigan where it had spent forty years on duty.

In 1913, the location was deemed unsatisfactory, and the cast iron lighthouse was moved  to the end of the pier.

In 1999, Lighthouse Digest published an extensive article on the light, filled with interesting anecdotes and ephemera.

Directions
In 2005 this museum reported it was "in the process" of acquiring the lighthouse.  It is accessible to the public, and located on the south pier at the mouth of the Black River, at the end of Water Street. Located at the end of the pier at the foot of Water Street in South Haven. One can get there by walking the pier after parking in the nearby city park. The site is open, but the tower is closed (except for open house during the city's mid-June Harborfest).

See also
 Lighthouses in the United States

Notes

Further reading

 Bibliography on Michigan lighthouses.
 Crompton, Samuel Willard  & Michael J. Rhein, The Ultimate Book of Lighthouses (2002) ; .
 Hyde, Charles K., and Ann and John Mahan. The Northern Lights: Lighthouses of the Upper Great Lakes.  Detroit: Wayne State University Press, 1995.    .
 Jones, Ray & Bruce Roberts, American Lighthouses (Globe Pequot, September 1, 1998, 1st Ed.) ; .
 Jones, Ray,The Lighthouse Encyclopedia, The Definitive Reference (Globe Pequot, January 1, 2004, 1st ed.) ; .
 Noble, Dennis, Lighthouses & Keepers: U. S. Lighthouse Service and Its Legacy (Annapolis: U. S. Naval Institute Press, 1997). ; .
 Oleszewski, Wes, Great Lakes Lighthouses, American and Canadian: A Comprehensive Directory/Guide to Great Lakes Lighthouses, (Gwinn, Michigan: Avery Color Studios, Inc., 1998) .
 Penrod, John, Lighthouses of Michigan, (Berrien Center, Michigan: Penrod/Hiawatha, 1998)  .
 
 Putnam, George R., Lighthouses and Lightships of the United States, (Boston: Houghton Mifflin Co., 1933).
 United States Coast Guard, Aids to Navigation, (Washington, DC: U. S. Government Printing Office, 1945).
 
 
 Wagner, John L., Michigan Lighthouses: An Aerial Photographic Perspective, (East Lansing, Michigan: John L. Wagner, 1998)  .
 Wargin, Ed, Legends of Light: A Michigan Lighthouse Portfolio (Ann Arbor Media Group, 2006).  .
 Wright, Larry and Wright, Patricia, Great Lakes Lighthouses Encyclopedia Hardback (Erin: Boston Mills Press, 2006)

External links

 Detroit News, Interactive map on Michigan lighthouses.
 Harrison, Timothy, South Haven Lights...Pages From Their Past, Lighthouse Digest.
 Lighthouse Central,  Photographs, History, Directions and Way points for Southhaven South Pier Light, The Ultimate Guide to West Michigan Lighthouses by Jerry Roach (Publisher: Bugs Publishing LLC). .

Lighthouses completed in 1872
Houses completed in 1872
Lighthouses completed in 1903
Lighthouses on the National Register of Historic Places in Michigan
Buildings and structures in Van Buren County, Michigan
Michigan State Historic Sites
Tourist attractions in Van Buren County, Michigan
Transportation in Van Buren County, Michigan
1872 establishments in Michigan
National Register of Historic Places in Van Buren County, Michigan